Lycinae is a subfamily of net-winged beetles in the family Lycidae.

Tribes and Genera
BioLib includes 11 tribes:

Calochromini
Auth.: Lacordaire, 1857 - sometimes placed as subfamily Calochrominae
 Calochromus Guérin-Ménéville, 1833
 Caloptognatha Green, 1954
 Dumbrellia Lea, 1909
 Lucaina Dugès, 1879
 Lygistopterus Mulsant, 1838
 Macrolygistopterus Pic, 1929

Calopterini
Auth.: Green, 1949; poss. incomplete genera:
subtribe Acroleptina Bocáková, 2005
 Acroleptus Bourgeois, 1886
 Aporrhipis Pascoe, 1887
 Paracroleptus costae (Ferreira, 2015)
subtribe Calopterina Green, 1949
 Calopteron Laporte, 1838
subtribe not determined
 Caenia Newman, 1838
 Ceratopriomorphus Pic, 1922
 Emplectus Erichson, 1847
 Idiopteron Bourgeois, 1905
 Leptoceletes Green, 1952
 Metapteron Bourgeois, 1905
 Xenolycus Ferreira & Silveira, 2020

Conderini
Auth.: Bocak & Bocakova, 1990
 Conderis Waterhouse, 1879
 Xylobanellus Kleine, 1930

Dihammatini
Auth.: Bocák & Bocáková, 2008
 Dihammatus Waterhouse 1879

Eurrhacini
Auth.: Bocakova, 2005
 Cladocalon Nascimento & Bocakova, 2022
 Currhaeus Nascimento, Bressan & Bocakova, 2020

Lycini
Auth.: Laporte de Castelnau, 1836; selected genera:
 Lopholycus Bourgeois, 1883
 Lyconotus Green, 1949
 Lycus Fabricius, 1787

Lyponiini
Auth.: Bocak & Bocakova, 1990
 Lyponia Waterhouse, 1878

Macrolycini
Auth.: Kleine, 1929
 Calcaeron Kazantsev, 2004
 Cerceros Kraatz, 1879
 Macrolycus Waterhouse, 1878

Melanerotini
Auth.: Kazantsev, 2010
 Melaneros Fairmaire, 1879
 Polyneros Kazantsev, 2009

Metriorrhynchini
Auth.: Kleine, 1926
subtribe Hemiconderinina Bocák & Bocáková, 1990
 Hemiconderis Kleine, 1926 (poss. misspelling: Hemiconderidis)
subtribe Metriorrhynchina Kleine, 1926
 Cautires Waterhouse, 1879
 Metriorrhynchus Gemminger & Harold, 1869
 Xylobanus Waterhouse, 1879
subtribe Trichalina Kleine, 1929
 Trichalus Waterhouse, 1877
unplaced genera
 Achras Waterhouse, 1879
 Broxylus Waterhouse, 1879
 Cladophorus Guérin-Méneville, 1830
 Enylus Waterhouse, 1879
 Flabellotrichalus Pic, 1921
 Mangkutanus Kubecek, Dvorak & Bocak, 2011
 Porrostoma Laporte, 1838
 Procautires Kleine, 1925
 Stadenus Waterhouse, 1879
 Synchonnus Waterhouse, 1879
 Wakarumbia Bocak, 1999

Platerodini
Auth.: Kleine, 1929
 Lyponia Waterhouse, 1878
 Melaneros Fairmaire, 1877
 Plateros Bourgeois, 1879
 Teroplas Gorham, 1884

Thonalmini
Auth.: Kleine, 1933
 Thonalmus Bourgeois, 1883

References

Further reading

External links

 

Lycidae
Articles created by Qbugbot
Beetle subfamilies